Parallelodontidae is a family of saltwater clams, marine bivalve molluscs that are related to the ark clams. This family contains at least four genera.

Species
Species within the family Parallelodontidae includes:
 Grammatodon 
 Parallelodon
 Parallelodon rugosus
 Pleurogrammatodon
 Porterius
 Porterius dalli

References

 
Bivalve families